Brazilian singer and drag queen Pabllo Vittar has released five studio albums, three extended plays, one live album and eighteen singles.

In December 2015, Vittar released his debut EP, Open Bar produced by Rodrigo Gorky, Maffalda and Omulu. The title track, "Minaj" and "Amante" were released as singles. The music video for "Open Bar" reached 1 million views on YouTube in only one month. The material brought Vittar media attention.

In January 2017, Vittar released his first studio album, Vai Passar Mal, which peaked at number 3 on Brazilian iTunes in its debut week. In addition, nine of the ten tracks from the record charted on Spotify's Top 50 list. Among the achievements, Vittar has become the most successful drag queen of all digital platforms. The second single from the album, "Todo Dia", became the theme of 2017 Brazilian Carnival. The third single from the album, "K.O.", surpassed the success of "Todo Dia" and made Vittar the first drag queen to enter the Brazilian charts, reaching number 67 on Brazil's Hot 100 Airplay.

Albums

Studio albums

Live albums

Remix albums

Extended plays

Singles

As lead artist

As featured artist

Promotional singles

Guest appearances

Music videos

References 

Pop music discographies
Discographies of Brazilian artists
Latin music discographies